Crockett Creek is a stream in Clay County in the U.S. state of Missouri.

Crockett Creek has the name of David Crockett, a local settler and relative of Davy Crockett.

See also
List of rivers of Missouri

References

Rivers of Clay County, Missouri
Rivers of Missouri